Aniceto de los Dolores Luis Gonzaga Ortega del Villar (17 April 1825 – 17 November 1875) was a Mexican physician, composer, and pianist. Although he had a distinguished career as a physician and surgeon, he is also remembered today for his 1871 opera Guatimotzin, one of the earliest Mexican operas to use a native subject. He is related to the Colonial Administrator and Archbishop of Nueva Espana, who became the Viceroy of Nueva Espana twice over. He became Conde del Peñasco by way of marriage, and was a Conde del Oploca by way of birth, amongst other titles.

Biography

Aniceto Ortega was born in Tulancingo, Hidalgo, on 17 April 1825, the second of three sons born to Francisco Ortega and MarÍa Josefa del Villar. His father was a statesman active in the Mexican independence movement and a prominent literary figure, who wrote the patriotic verse drama México libre (Free Mexico). Both Ancieto and his older brother, Francisco, studied medicine at the Escuela Nacional de Medicina in Mexico City. There he specialised in obstetrics and gynaecology and received his degree in 1845. After further medical studies in Paris, he went on to become a professor at the medical school in Mexico City and was one of the founders (and later Director) of Mexico's first hospital for women and children, the Casa de Maternidad e Infancia.

Ortega also had a parallel career as a musician. His first composition the Marcha Zaragoza (1862), was named for the Mexican patriot and general, Ignacio Zaragoza, and became Mexico's second national anthem. He composed two other marches, Potosina and Republicana and several piano pieces, most notably Invocación a Beethoven, first performed in 1867. In 1866, he became one of the founders of the Sociedad Filarmónica Mexicana (Mexican Philharmonic Society) which played a crucial role in the establishment of Mexico's National Conservatory of Music. His opera, Guatimotzin, a romanticised account of the defense of Mexico by its last Aztec emperor, Cuauhtémoc, was one of the earliest Mexican operas to use a native subject. Guatimotzin premiered on 13 September 1871 at the Gran Teatro Nacional in Mexico City, with Ángela Peralta and Enrico Tamberlik in the leading roles.

Aniceto Ortega died at the age of 50 on 17 November 1875 in Mexico City and was buried in the chapel of the Escuela Nacional de Medicina. The central plaza in Pachuca, Hidalgo, bears his name.

Partial list of works

Piano
Invocación a Beethoven
Elegía, amor e inocencia
Romanza sin palabras
El canto de la huilota
Recuerdo de amistad (dedicated to the Mexican virtuouso pianist and composer, Tomás León)
Waltzes
 Enriqueta (waltz-jarabe) 
Brillante  
Marches
Zaragoza
Potosina
Republicana
Opera
Guatimotzin (in 9 scenes to a libretto by José Cuellar)

Notes and references

Sources
Elías, Roberto Uribe, La cirugía mexicana en ginecología y obstetricia durante el siglo XIX, Cirugía y Cirujanos, Vol. 75, No. 2, March–April  2007, pp. 139–144 (accessed 26 March 2010, in Spanish)
Grout, Donald Jay and Williams, Hermine Weigel, A short history of opera, Columbia University Press, 2003. 
Sierra, Justo (ed.), "Francisco Ortega", Antología del Centenario (originally published in 1910), UNAM, 1985, pp. 140–141.  (in Spanish)
Sosa, José Octavio, "Ortega, Aniceto", Diccionario de la Ópera Mexicana, Consejo Nacional para la Cultura y las Artes, 2005 (reprinted on operacalli.com with permission of the author) (accessed 26 March 2010, in Spanish) 
   
Velázquez, Jorge,  El pianismo mexicano del siglo XIX, Anales del Instituto de Investigaciones Estéticas, Vol. XIII, No. 50, 1982, pp. 205–240 (accessed 26 March 2010, in Spanish)

External links
Audio file: Marcha Zaragoza by Aniceto Ortega de Villar played by the Orquesta Clásica de México, conducted by Carlos Esteva

Mexican classical composers
Mexican opera composers
Male opera composers
Mexican obstetricians
Mexican classical pianists
Male classical pianists
1825 births
1875 deaths
People from Tulancingo
19th-century classical composers
Mexican male classical composers
19th-century classical pianists
19th-century male musicians